Ibrahim Usman (born 23 July 1999) is a Nigerian professional footballer who plays for French club Gazélec Ajaccio.

Career 
On 14 February 2018, Usman signed with the Seattle Sounders FC 2 of the United Soccer League from ECO FC Lagos.

References

External links 
 S2 Profile
 

1999 births
Living people
Nigerian footballers
Nigerian expatriate footballers
Association football defenders
Tacoma Defiance players
Gazélec Ajaccio players
USL Championship players
Championnat National players
Expatriate soccer players in the United States
Expatriate footballers in France
Nigerian expatriate sportspeople in the United States
Nigerian expatriate sportspeople in France